The Quad City Challenger is a family of one and two seats-in-tandem, pusher configuration, tricycle landing gear ultralight aircraft that is designed and produced by Quad City Aircraft Corporation of Moline, Illinois. The Challenger was first introduced in 1983.

Design and development
The Challenger ultralight is a high wing, tricycle gear kit aircraft with a frame structure built from 6061-T6 aluminum alloy tubing fastened with aircraft grade AN bolts and rivets and covered with either presewn Dacron envelopes or standard aircraft fabric. The engine is mounted in pusher configuration and turns the propeller through a reduction drive that uses a cogged tooth rubber belt.

The kit can be purchased in 4 major sub-kits: the Tail Assembly, Fuselage, Wings, and Engine. The factory kit is supplied with the most difficult mechanical work already completed. This includes the primary fuselage  framework along with the controls and the basic wing structures assembled at the factory. The kit builder is required to finish the smaller structural components, cover the aluminum frames with fabric, seal and paint the fabric and do the final assembly.

The aircraft has the ability to soar with its motor switched off.

The Challenger design has been criticized by reviewers for its landing gear, which is a rigid cable-braced type and is subject to being bent during hard landings. A number of after-market suppliers have designed steel gear legs as replacements for the stock landing gear in an attempt to rectify this problem. The improved factory-designed Light Sport Special (LSS) model incorporates revised landing gear to address this deficiency.

In November 2018, the design was subject to a Transportation Safety Board of Canada Aviation Safety Advisory due to an accident on 30 July 2018 where a Challenger crashed and the pilot was killed. The investigation determined that the right front lift strut lower bracket had failed due to fatigue after only 402.2 hours in service. The bracket has a 500 hour component life and is subject to 50 hour periodic inspections. Examination of 22 other Challengers found eight that also had cracked brackets.

Variants
Challenger I (Challenger UL)
Single seat,  wingspan gives lower stall speed. Can be fitted with a variety of engines. Qualifies as a US "Experimental - Amateur-Built", Light sport aircraft or with the  Hirth F-33 engine as a US FAR 103 Ultralight Vehicle, 800 reported completed and flown by the fall of 2011.
Challenger I Special
Single seat,  wingspan gives faster roll rate. Engines  Rotax 447,  Rotax 503,  582 or  HKS 700E. Qualifies as a US Experimental - Amateur-Built or Light sport aircraft, 300 reported completed and flown by the fall of 2011.
Challenger II
Two seats in tandem,  wingspan provides more lift and lower stall speed. Can be equipped with floats. Engines  Rotax 447,  Rotax 503,  582 or  HKS 700E. Qualifies as a US Experimental - Amateur-Built or Light sport aircraft, 2000 reported completed and flown by the fall of 2011.
Challenger II Special
Two seats in tandem,  wingspan gives faster roll rate. Engines  Rotax 447,  Rotax 503,  582 or  HKS 700E. Qualifies as a US Experimental - Amateur-Built or Light sport aircraft, 350 reported completed and flown by the fall of 2011.
Challenger II CW LSS
Two seats in tandem, . Engine  Rotax 503,  582 or  HKS 700E. This model incorporates many revisions to the basic Challenger design, including a larger and re-shaped vertical fin, fiberglass wing tips and redesigned landing gear. Qualifies as a US Light sport aircraft, 110 reported completed and flown by the fall of 2011.
Challenger II LSS XL-65
Two seats in tandem, . Engine  Rotax 582. Qualifies as a US Light sport aircraft, ten reported completed and flown by the fall of 2011.

Specifications (Challenger II)

See also

References

External links

1980s United States ultralight aircraft
Light-sport aircraft
Single-engined pusher aircraft
High-wing aircraft
Aircraft first flown in 1983